Saint-Georges-d'Espéranche is a commune in the Isère department in southeastern France.

History
The medieval architect and castle builder for Edward I of England, Master James of Saint George, also known as Jacques de Saint-Georges d'Espéranche, constructed the castle for Philip I, Count of Savoy. On 23 June 1273 he met King Edward I of England there, and it is likely the castle inspired the later construction of the UNESCO listed castles of north Wales.

Population

See also
Communes of the Isère department

References

Communes of Isère
Isère communes articles needing translation from French Wikipedia